St Michael and All Angels Church, Aston Clinton, Buckinghamshire, England. This beautiful 12th-century church lies within the Anglican Diocese of Oxford.

Photo gallery

External links
 History of St Michael and All Angels, Aston Clinton

Church of England church buildings in Buckinghamshire
Diocese of Oxford